Foodbeast (stylized in all caps) is a food and drink publication and influencer network company headquartered in Santa Ana, California.

History
Founded by Elie Ayrouth in 2008, Members of the Foodbeast staff were featured on an MTV2 show entitled "Jobs That Don't Suck" in April 2014. Their episode chronicled the day-to-day of founders Elie Ayrouth, Rudy Chaney as they opened food packages and visited the Taco Bell test kitchen.

Food Festivals
In the summer of 2019, Foodbeast launched an offshoot of their Noods Noods Noods festival called Nood Beach. The festival, hosted in Huntington Beach, featured dozens of noodle vendors and music headliners Snoop Dogg, E-40, and Dash Berlin.

Foodbeast 'Dream Machine'
On February 28, 2019, Foodbeast released a social-media-powered vending machine in collaboration with Nissin Foods USA. 'The Dream Machine,' began as a joke in a creative meeting, according to Foodbeast CTO Rudy Chaney. 

Foodbeast released two machines, one in a mall in Las Vegas, and another in Los Angeles. “We’re hoping this machine allows for the democratization of the Instagram influencer experience,” Chaney told US Magazine.

Controversy

In-N-Out 'Monkey Style' Burger
On June 28, 2013, a video was uploaded to Foodbeast.com's YouTube channel entitled "Ordering a Monkey Style Burger from In-N-Out."

The video depicted Ayrouth in an In-N-Out drive-thru ordering what he claims is a "Monkey Style" burger, a hamburger topped with the chain's Animal Style fries (cheese, grilled onions and spread). Playing off In-N-Out fandom, the video and subsequent screenshots quickly made their way across the web, with major news outlets scrutinizing every frame of the video. What resulted was waves of interested patrons ordering their burger 'Monkey Style' to no avail.

"There is no such thing," Carl Van Fleet, a vice president at In-N-Out Burger, said in a statement. "It seems to be a story that originated somewhere in cyberspace. For a variety of reasons, we're unable to prepare burgers in the manner that a few websites have described as 'monkey style.' " 

CBS covered the story in a late-night piece, with their KCAL9 team asking Ayrouth "if he tried to create a hoax by simply putting an order of fries on top of a burger." KCAL9 states that he did not respond to the questioning.

References 

Websites about food and drink
American blogs